Emily Brooke ("Brookie") Maxwell (October 15, 1956 – November 4, 2015) was an American artist and curator.

Early life
Maxwell was born in Manhattan, New York to parents William Maxwell, a literary editor for The New Yorker Magazine, and Emily Noyes, a poet. Maxwell received a degree in Fine Arts from the School of Visual Arts in 1977.

Career
In 1986 Maxwell founded the Creative Arts Workshops to serve children living in New York's homeless shelters and welfare-subsidized hotels. The best-known project of the Workshops was "Calle de Suenos", or "Street of Dreams" in English, a 5000 square-foot mural on Lexington avenue near 124th street, New York.  

In 1999 Maxwell founded Gallery 138 in Soho, New York City to represent emerging artists. 
 
Her work is included in the art collections of the US Department of State and the Brooklyn Museum.

She died of ovarian cancer in 2015.

References

1956 births
2015 deaths
20th-century American women artists
21st-century American women artists
Artists from New York City
American women curators
American curators